In physics and chemistry, binding energy is the smallest amount of energy required to remove a particle from a system of particles or to disassemble a system of particles into individual parts.  In the former meaning the term is predominantly used in condensed matter physics, atomic physics, and chemistry, whereas in nuclear physics the term separation energy is used.

A bound system is typically at a lower energy level than its unbound constituents. According to relativity theory, a  decrease in the total energy of a system is accompanied by a decrease  in the total mass, where .

Types of binding energy
There are several types of binding energy, each operating over a different distance and energy scale. The smaller the size of a bound system, the higher its associated binding energy.

Mass–energy relation

A bound system is typically at a lower energy level than its unbound constituents because its mass must be less than the total mass of its unbound constituents. For systems with low binding energies, this "lost" mass after binding may be fractionally small, whereas for systems with high binding energies, the missing mass may be an easily measurable fraction. This missing mass may be lost during the process of binding as energy in the form of heat or light, with the removed energy corresponding to the removed mass through Einstein's equation . In the process of binding, the constituents of the system might enter higher energy states of the nucleus/atom/molecule while retaining their mass, and because of this, it is necessary that they are removed from the system before its mass can decrease. Once the system cools to normal temperatures and returns to ground states regarding energy levels, it will contain less mass than when it first combined and was at high energy. This loss of heat represents the "mass deficit", and the heat itself retains the mass that was lost (from the point of view of the initial system). This mass will appear in any other system that absorbs the heat and gains thermal energy.

For example, if two objects are attracting each other in space through their gravitational field, the attraction force accelerates the objects, increasing their velocity, which converts their potential energy (gravity) into kinetic energy. When the particles either pass through each other without interaction or elastically repel during the collision, the gained kinetic energy (related to speed) begins to revert into potential energy, driving the collided particles apart. The decelerating particles will return to the initial distance and beyond into infinity, or stop and repeat the collision (oscillation takes place). This shows that the system, which loses no energy, does not combine (bind) into a solid object, parts of which oscillate at short distances. Therefore, to bind the particles, the kinetic energy gained due to the attraction must be dissipated by resistive force. Complex objects in collision ordinarily undergo inelastic collision, transforming some kinetic energy into internal energy (heat content, which is atomic movement), which is further radiated in the form of photonsthe light and heat. Once the energy to escape the gravity is dissipated in the collision, the parts will oscillate at a closer, possibly atomic, distance, thus looking like one solid object. This lost energy, necessary to overcome the potential barrier to separate the objects, is the binding energy. If this binding energy were retained in the system as heat, its mass would not decrease, whereas binding energy lost from the system as heat radiation would itself have mass. It directly represents the "mass deficit" of the cold, bound system.

Closely analogous considerations apply in chemical and nuclear reactions. Exothermic chemical reactions in closed systems do not change mass, but do become less massive once the heat of reaction is removed, though this mass change is too small to measure with standard equipment. In nuclear reactions, the fraction of mass that may be removed as light or heat, i.e. binding energy, is often a much larger fraction of the system mass. It may thus be measured directly as a mass difference between rest masses of reactants and (cooled) products. This is because nuclear forces are comparatively stronger than the Coulombic forces associated with the interactions between electrons and protons that generate heat in chemistry.

Mass change
Mass change (decrease) in bound systems, particularly atomic nuclei, has also been termed mass defect, mass deficit, or mass packing fraction.

The difference between the unbound system calculated mass and experimentally measured mass of nucleus (mass change) is denoted as Δm. It can be calculated as follows:
Mass change = (unbound system calculated mass) − (measured mass of system)
 e.g. (sum of masses of protons and neutrons) − (measured mass of nucleus)

After a nuclear reaction occurs that results in an excited nucleus, the energy that must be radiated or otherwise removed as binding energy in order to decay to the unexcited state may be in one of several forms. This may be electromagnetic waves, such as gamma radiation; the kinetic energy of an ejected particle, such as an electron, in internal conversion decay; or partly as the rest mass of one or more emitted particles, such as the particles of beta decay. No mass deficit can appear, in theory, until this radiation or this energy has been emitted and is no longer part of the system.

When nucleons bind together to form a nucleus, they must lose a small amount of mass, i.e. there is a change in mass to stay bound. This mass change must be released as various types of photon or other particle energy as above, according to the relation . Thus, after the binding energy has been removed, binding energy = mass change × . This energy is a measure of the forces that hold the nucleons together. It represents energy that must be resupplied from the environment for the nucleus to be broken up into individual nucleons.

For example, an atom of deuterium has a mass defect of 0.0023884 Da, and its binding energy is nearly equal to 2.23 MeV. This means that energy of 2.23 MeV is required to disintegrate an atom of deuterium.

The energy given off during either nuclear fusion or nuclear fission is the difference of the binding energies of the "fuel", i.e. the initial nuclide(s), from that of the fission or fusion products. In practice, this energy may also be calculated from the substantial mass differences between the fuel and products, which uses previous measurements of the atomic masses of known nuclides, which always have the same mass for each species. This mass difference appears once evolved heat and radiation have been removed, which is required for measuring the (rest) masses of the (non-excited) nuclides involved in such calculations.

See also
Bond energy and bond-dissociation energy
Gravitational binding energy
Ionization energy (binding energy of one electron)
Nuclear binding energy
Quantum chromodynamics binding energy
Semi-empirical mass formula
Separation energy (binding energy of one nucleon)
Virial mass
Prout's hypothesis, an early model of the atom that did not account for mass defect

References

External links
Nuclear Binding Energy
Mass and Nuclide Stability
Experimental atomic mass data compiled Nov. 2003

 
Energy (physics)
Mass spectrometry
Nuclear physics
Forms of energy